Allotinus albatus is a butterfly in the family Lycaenidae. It was described by father and son entomologists Cajetan and Rudolf Felder in 1865. It is found on Sulawesi and the Philippines (Luzon).

Subspecies
Alotinus albatus albatus (Sulawesi)
Allotinus albatus mendax Eliot, 1986 (Philippines: Luzon)

References

Butterflies described in 1865
Allotinus
Butterflies of Asia
Taxa named by Baron Cajetan von Felder
Taxa named by Rudolf Felder